Kim Ellen Thomson (born 30 October 1959) is an English actress who has appeared on stage, television and film since the early 1980s in both the United Kingdom and the United States of America.

Early life
Thomson was born on 30 October 1959, although other sources have said in 1960 and 1964, in Bath, Somerset, England, (official site says Scotland) to a Scottish father and Irish mother. Her parents split up when she was three and she was brought up in Surrey by her father's parents, who were originally from Alloa. At the age of six, she was sent to a boarding school for five years. Much later she went on record to say boarding schools should be abolished.

She trained as an actress at the Central School of Speech and Drama.

Career
Her most memorable role was that of Lesley Bainbridge in the BBC sit-com Brush Strokes, which at its peak, was watched by over 15 million people with the British tabloids avidly following the storyline.
In the 1987 episode of the TV series "Tales of the Unexpected" Thomson played the role of hotel maid Elly Somerton alongside Topol who starred as the lead character Professor Max Kelada.
Thomson shared her first lead in Stealing Heaven (1988) with Derek de Lint and Denholm Elliott. In its review, Films and filming said "Kim Thomson's Heloïse moves with delicate poise, a heroine worthy of Rossetti or Burne-Jones, with vivacity and intelligence." The next year, 1989, she played Estella in a film of Great Expectations directed by Kevin Connor, with Jean Simmons, who had played Estella in the 1946 film, as Miss Havisham. Also in 1989 she was Cordelia on stage in King Lear, directed by Jonathan Miller, with the British Theatre Yearbook commenting "Kim Thomson's Cordelia can rarely have been equalled; she was exquisite in beauty, tender in care, full of youthful integrity."
 
In 1992, Thomson was the leading lady of the TV series Virtual Murder, and in 1994 played another leading role in a costume drama series, The Wanderer. Dozens more appearances in film and on television followed, often as a character actress, such as her role as a society reporter in The Princess Diaries 2: Royal Engagement (2004).

In 1997, she took on the part of Lady Chiltern in An Ideal Husband, of which the Theatre Record said "Others have played this pure, cool, idealistic, demanding role with more authority and finesse, but she is simply right for it". In 2001, she was Irina in a new West End theatre production of Uncle Vanya directed by Peter Gill.

During 2008 Thomson had a recurring role in ITV's detective show The Bill, as barrister Naomi Woods, wife of DC Jacob Banks.

In March 2009, she became a regular cast member of the ITV1 soap opera Emmerdale, playing the role of Faye Lamb. At the end of 2009, she signed a new contract with the show. In January 2011, it was reported that she was leaving the show and would make her on-screen departure later in the year.

Personal life
In 2010, Thomson graduated from the University of London with a degree in politics, philosophy and history.

Film and television

The Lords of Discipline (1983) - Girlfriend
Party Party – Brenda (1983)
Screamtime – Lady Anne (1983)
Cover Her Face – Sally Jupp (4 episodes, 1985)  
Lovejoy (1986) "The Firefly Cage" – Nicola Page
Brush Strokes – Lesley Bainbridge (1986)
The Life and Loves of a She-Devil – Elsie Flowers (1986)
The Ruth Rendell Mysteries – "Wolf to the Slaughter" - Linda Grover (1987)
A Killing on the Exchange (1987)
Stealing Heaven – Heloise (1988)
Tales of the Unexpected – Elly Somerton (1988) - episode (9/10) "Mr Know-All"
The Tall Guy – Cheryl (1989)
Minder – "Fatal Impression" Sylvie (1989)
Great Expectations – Estella (1989)
Jekyll & Hyde – Lucy Harris (1990)
Perry Mason: The Case of the Desperate Deception — Cathy Bramwell (1990)
Inspector Morse – "The Sins of the Fathers" Helen Radford (1990)
Hands of a Murderer (TV film) – Sophie DeVere (1990)
Murder 101 – Francesca Lavin (1991)
The Adventures of Sherlock Holmes: "The Illustrious Client"  (1991) – Kitty Winter
Virtual Murder – Samantha Valentine (1992)
The Wanderer – Beatrice (1994)
Loved By You – Becky Edwards (1997)
The 10th Kingdom – Queen Riding Hood III (2000)
Midsomer Murders – Janet Reason (2001)
The Princess Diaries 2: Royal Engagement (2004) – Elsie Kentworthy, reporter
Rosemary & Thyme (2006) – Andrea
Secret Diary of a Call Girl (2007) – Della
1408 (2007) – Desk Clerk
Messages (2007) – Frances Beale
The Street (2007) – Pat Tinsey
Judge John Deed (2007) – Marie Madsen
The Bill (2008) – Naomi Woods
New Tricks (2008) – Tiffany Barker
The Green Green Grass (2009) – Antonia Page
Taggart (2009) – Phyllis
Emmerdale – Faye Lamb (2009–2011)
Casualty (2009) – Amber
Holby City (2014) – Catherine O'Malley

Theatre

References

External links

1959 births
Alumni of the Royal Central School of Speech and Drama
Alumni of the University of London
English film actresses
English soap opera actresses
English stage actresses
English television actresses
Living people
People from Bath, Somerset
English people of Scottish descent
English people of Irish descent